James Walter Castor (January 23, 1940 – January 16, 2012) was an American funk, R&B, and soul musician. He is credited with vocals, saxophone and composition. He is best known for songs such as "It's Just Begun", "The Bertha Butt Boogie", and his biggest hit single, the million-seller "Troglodyte (Cave Man)." Castor has been described as "one of the most sampled artists in music history" by the BBC.

Musical career
He was born in Manhattan, New York, United States. He started a group called Jimmy and the Juniors, who in 1956 recorded the original version of "I Promise to Remember", which according to Castor Mercury Records did not want to promote. George Goldner had the famous doo-wop group The Teenagers record it and it became their third hit single. Later, Castor was asked to join the Teenagers. In late 1966, he released "Hey Leroy, Your Mama's Callin' You".

As a solo artist and leader of The Jimmy Castor Bunch (TJCB) in the 1970s, Castor released several successful albums and singles. TJCB hit their commercial peak in 1972 upon the release of their album, It's Just Begun, which featured two hit singles: the title track and "Troglodyte (Cave Man)", the latter of which became quite popular in the US, hitting #6 on the Billboard Hot 100. The track stayed on the chart for 14 weeks and on June 30, 1972, received a gold disc award from the RIAA for sales of a million copies. Castor released "It's Just Begun" in 1972. In 1973, he recorded a soprano saxophone instrumental cover of "A Whiter Shade of Pale" written by Gary Brooker, Keith Reid and Matthew Fisher (from Procol Harum), on a tune inspired by J.S.Bach's Orchestral Suite No. 3 BWV1068 in his "Air on the G string". Afrika Bambaataa said that "It's Just Begun" was very popular at South Bronx block parties in the 1970s. Later popular songs included "Bertha Butt Boogie", "Potential", "King Kong" and "A Groove Will Make You Move" in 1975 and 1976.

The Jimmy Castor Bunch included keyboardist/trumpeter Gerry Thomas, bassist Doug Gibson, guitarist Harry Jensen, conga player Lenny Fridle, Jr., and drummer Bobby Manigault. Thomas also recorded with the Fatback Band, leaving TJCB in the 1980s to exclusively record with them.

Death and legacy 
Castor died of heart failure on January 16, 2012, in Henderson, Nevada, just a week short of his 72nd birthday.

Many of the group's tunes have been heavily sampled in films and in hip-hop. In particular, the saxophone hook and groove from the title track of "It's Just Begun". For example Ice-T sampled the track for the title track of his 1988 album Power. Also, heavy sampled is the spoken word intro and groove from "Troglodyte (Cave Man)" (namely, "What we're gonna do right here is go back, way back, back into time..." and "Gotta find a woman, gotta find a woman"). Industrial hip hop group Tackhead covered the song "Just Begun" for the digital release of their album, For the Love of Money.

Family 
Castor's son, J-Cast, choose his stage name by using letters from Jimmy "J" and Castor "Cast". J-Cast released an album, J-Cast for President, on June 24, 2009, which was popular in Japan. Jimmy had three other  children; April, Jimmy Jr. and Sheli and ten grandchildren.

Discography

Albums

Chart singles
Note: All credited to The Jimmy Castor Bunch unless otherwise stated.

Notes

Note: Some other sources give different years of birth, between 1943 and 1947, though an obituary from The New York Times states: "James Walter Castor was born on January 23, 1940, in Manhattan. (His son said that for years he had let others assume he was far younger than he was, by as much as seven years.)"

References

External links
 Detailed biography
  as Jimmy Castor
  as The Jimmy Castor Bunch
 Entries at 45cat.com

1940 births
2012 deaths
20th-century African-American male singers
American male singers
African-American songwriters
American funk saxophonists
American male saxophonists
Singers from New York City
Smash Records artists
Songwriters from New York (state)
The Teenagers members
21st-century African-American people
American male songwriters
20th-century American saxophonists